Avijan (also Romanized as Āvījān; also known as Āb Jūb) is a village in Fakhrud Rural District, Qohestan District, Darmian County, South Khorasan Province, Iran. At the 2006 census, its population was 194, in 50 families.

References 

Populated places in Darmian County